Josep Comas i Solà (Barcelona 17 December 1868 – 2 December 1937) was a Spanish astronomer, of Catalan origin, discoverer of minor planets, comets, and double stars.

He wrote his first astronomy notes at 10, and was only fifteen when he published an article in a French specialist magazine.

He observed planets including Mars and Saturn, measuring the rotation period of the latter. He wrote some books popularizing astronomy, and was first president of the Spanish and American Astronomical Society (S.A.D.E.Y.A.). He discovered the periodic comet 32P/Comas Solà, and co-discovered the non-periodic comet C/1925 F1 (Shajn-Comas Solà); he is also credited by the Minor Planet Center with the discovery of 11 asteroids during 1915–1930. Comas i Solà is also credited with the discovery of the double star SOL 1.

In 1905, Solà received the Prix Jules Janssen, the highest award of the Société astronomique de France, the French astronomical society. In 1908 he claimed to observe limb darkening of Saturn's moon Titan, the first evidence that the body had an atmosphere. He was the head of Fabra Observatory since it was established in 1904.

The asteroids 1102 Pepita (from his nickname Pepito) and 1655 Comas Solà are named after him, as is Comas Sola crater on Mars.

References

External links 
 Josep Comas i Solà at astrogea.org 
 1915: Descubrimiento del primer asteroide por científicos españoles
 Josep Comas i Solà: divulgador científico 
 José Comas y Solá, un barcelonés con estrella
 Vil·la Urània de Josep Comas i Solà
 José Comas i Solá, astrónomo

1868 births
1937 deaths
20th-century Spanish astronomers
Astronomers from Catalonia
Discoverers of asteroids
Discoverers of comets
Scientists from Barcelona
19th-century Spanish astronomers